= Kashmir Images =

Indian newspaper

- Type: Daily newspaper
- Format: Broadsheet
- Owner(s): Bashir Manzar
- Founded: 1996; 29 years ago
- Language: English
- Headquarters: Srinagar
- Country: India
- Website: thekashmirimages.com

Kashmir Images is an English language daily newspaper operating from Srinagar, Kashmir started in 1996.

== Incidents ==
On 29 May 2002, three men entered the offices of the newspaper, questioned subeditor Zafar Iqbal for 20 minutes and then shot him. In November, photographer Farooq Javed Khan was attacked by police after leaving the newspaper's office. Neither incident was investigated by authorities.

Unrest in Kashmir in 2016 had negative financial effects on the newspaper as a decline in government projects led to the withdrawal of advertising and reductions in revenue.
